Josef "Sepp" Dürr (26 December 1953 – 26 January 2023) was a German farmer and politician. A member of Alliance 90/The Greens, he served in the Landtag of Bavaria from 1998 to 2018.

Dürr died of cancer on 26 January 2023, at the age of 69.

References

1953 births
2023 deaths
German farmers
Alliance 90/The Greens politicians
Members of the Landtag of Bavaria
Politicians from Munich